Global Kryner were a six-piece Austrian folk group, consisting of clarinet player Christof Spörk, bass trombonist, tenor and yodeller Sebastian Fuchsberger, guitarist Edi Koehldorfer, trumpet player Karl Rossmann, accordion player Anton Sauprügl, and jazz vocalist Sabine Stieger. The group has won numerous awards in Germany and Austria, and represented Austria in the Eurovision Song Contest 2005 in Kyiv, Ukraine.

2005 Eurovision Song Contest 

Global Kryner were the first band to perform in the semi-final of the 2005 Eurovision Song Contest, opening the show, but did not receive enough televotes to progress to the final, coming 21st out of 25 countries. Due to this poor result for the band, the Austrian national broadcaster ORF announced its withdrawal from the Eurovision Song Contest, releasing a statement describing it as "an absurd competition in which Austrian musical tradition means nothing". However, after a one-year break, Austria returned to the contest in 2007.

Discography 
 Global Kryner, April 2004
 Krynology, May 2005
 Weg, January 2008
 Live in Luxembourg, January 2009
 Global Kryner versus The Rounder Girls, January 2010

References

External links 

 
 

Austrian folk music groups
Eurovision Song Contest entrants for Austria
Eurovision Song Contest entrants of 2005
Musical groups from Vienna